Timezrit, Boumerdès (Arabic نيمزريت, Kabyle Timeẓrit) is a town and commune in the Isser District of Boumerdès Province, Algeria, on the western slopes of Sidi Ali Bounab. According to the 1998 census it has a population of 10,699.

History

In the early 19th century the hill of Timezrit was the location of a mosque with a minaret and a market held on Sundays, Had-Timezrit.  This was the central market of the Iflisen Umellil, shared between the Oulad Yahia Moussa, the Rouafa, and the Beni-Hammad.  Nearby was the village of Ihaddaden.

Notable people

References

Communes of Boumerdès Province